Mahadathika Mahanaga was King of Anuradhapura in the 1st century CE.  His reign lasted from 9 CE to 21 CE. He succeeded his brother, Bhatikabhaya Abhaya as King of Anuradhapura and was succeeded by his son, Amandagamani Abhaya.

See also
 List of Sri Lankan monarchs
 History of Sri Lanka

References

External links
 Kings & Rulers of Sri Lanka
 Codrington's Short History of Ceylon

M
M
M
M
 Sinhalese Buddhist monarchs